The 1988 United States presidential election in Mississippi took place on November 8, 1988. All fifty states and the District of Columbia, were part of the 1988 United States presidential election. Mississippi voters chose seven electors to the Electoral College, which selected the president and vice president.

Mississippi was won by incumbent United States Vice President George H. W. Bush of Texas, who was running against Massachusetts Governor Michael Dukakis. Bush ran with Indiana Senator Dan Quayle as Vice President, and Dukakis ran with Texas Senator Lloyd Bentsen.

Mississippi weighed in for this election as thirteen percentage points more Republican than the national average. The presidential election of 1988 was a very partisan election for Mississippi, with 99 percent of the electorate voting for either the Democratic or Republican parties. Notably, however, George County, in Mississippi's Pine Belt, gave former Ku Klux Klan Grand Wizard David Duke his largest vote share of any county in the country (about 4%). George County also gave third parties in the aggregate their largest vote share of any county in the country.

, this is the last election in which Adams County, Kemper County, Washington County, and Leflore County voted for the Republican presidential nominee; and the last in which Hinds County, the most populous in the state, gave a Republican an outright majority.

Bush carried Mississippi by a 20-point margin. Mississippi, along with the rest of the Deep South apart from Louisiana, was amongst the strongest of Bush's regions, a dramatic reversal from 1976 and even 1980, when Reagan carried Mississippi, Alabama, and South Carolina only narrowly. Even though Mississippi has remained reliably red at the presidential level, no Republican has achieved as high a vote share as Bush's 59.9% since 1988. Bush carried Hinds County, Mississippi's most populous county, by a double-digit margin; he narrowly carried it again in 1992, but it has never voted Republican again, and to the contrary has given Democrats over 70% of its vote in every election from 2012 on. In 1988, however, Dukakis' support in the Magnolia State was largely limited to Mississippi's share of the Black Belt; every county he carried in the state has remained a Democratic stronghold ever since apart from Benton County.

Harry Allen, Rhesa Barksdale, Robbie Hughes, Henry Paris, Fred Reeder, Michael Allred, and Ed Weeks were the Republican electors that cast their ballots for Bush and Quayle. Allred was selected to replace John Palmer as Palmer was unable to cast his ballot.

Results

Results by county

See also
 Presidency of George H. W. Bush

References

Mississippi
1988
1988 Mississippi elections